Dylan Christopher Minnette (born December 29, 1996) is an American actor, musician, and singer. He is known for his role as Clay Jensen in the Netflix drama series 13 Reasons Why. He has made guest appearances in several television series, such as Lost, Awake, Scandal, Grey's Anatomy, Supernatural, Prison Break, Scandal and Marvel's Agents of S.H.I.E.L.D.. He is also the lead vocalist and rhythm guitarist for the American alternative rock band Wallows.

In films, Minnette has appeared in the horror film Let Me In (2010), the thriller film Prisoners (2013), the family comedy film Alexander and the Terrible, Horrible, No Good, Very Bad Day (2014), the family fantasy film Goosebumps (2015), and the horror films Don't Breathe (2016), The Open House (2018) and Scream  (2022).

Early life
Minnette was born in Evansville, Indiana, the only child of Robyn and Craig Minnette. The family moved to Champaign, Illinois, where they lived for five years, and later moved to Los Angeles, California, so that he could pursue a career in acting.

Career

Acting

Minnette's first role was a single episode of Drake & Josh. He later appeared in the NBC original film The Year Without a Santa Claus, as an unnamed character in Fred Claus, as Todd Lyons in the film The Clique, and as Noah Framm in Snow Buddies. Notable television roles of Minnette's include the young version of the character Michael Scofield on Prison Break and character Clay Norman on Saving Grace. He played a bully named Kenny in Let Me In, released in October 2010.

He also played a role as Jerry Grant Jr. on ABC's Scandal as the son of the president of the United States. Minnette has also appeared in several commercials and in four episodes of Lost as Jack's son in the sideways timeline. Minnette appeared in "The Crow & the Butterfly" video from the rock group Shinedown.

In 2014, Minnette appeared in the comedy film Alexander and the Terrible, Horrible, No Good, Very Bad Day as Anthony Cooper, first child of the Cooper children and the elder brother of the titular character. The film was based on Judith Viorst’s 1972 children's book of the same name. In the following year, Minnette co-starred in the film Goosebumps, based on the R. L. Stine's children's horror book series of the same name. The film was a commercial success and garnered generally positive reviews from critics, grossing over $158 million.

In 2016, Minnette starred in the horror film Don't Breathe which was directed by Fede Álvarez. A sleeper hit, Don't Breathe received critical acclaim and grossed over $156million.

From 2017, Minnette began starring in the Netflix teen drama television series 13 Reasons Why, an adaptation of the 2007 novel of the same name, as Clay Jensen. His portrayal won him critical praise; The Hollywood Reporter wrote:  "Minnette is so dedicated to playing despondent that the relief and pleasure in brief scenes of flirty banter between Hannah and Clay is palpable". He was in the show for four seasons until it ended in 2020. He also starred in the Netflix film The Open House, which premiered in January 2018.

In September 2020, Minnette was cast as Wes Hicks in the fifth Scream film, which was directed by Matt Bettinelli-Olpin and Tyler Gillett. The film was released on January 14, 2022.

Music
Minnette is the singer and rhythm guitarist in the band Wallows, with Cole Preston (drums) and Braeden Lemasters (singer, guitar). Before 2017, they were known as the Feaver and later the Narwhals. They performed at Summer Meltdown, a concert for autism awareness in 2010 and won a battle of the bands contest the same year, sponsored by 98.7 FM. They played at Vans Warped Tour 2011 and have since performed at many Los Angeles venues including the Roxy Theatre and Whisky a Go Go. Their song "Bleeding Man" was used in the promo for season 2 of R.L. Stine's The Haunting Hour.

Throughout 2017, they released four singles on Apple Music and Spotify: "Pleaser", "Sun Tan", "Uncomfortable" and "Pulling Leaves Off Trees". In 2018, they released their debut EP Spring, including singles "Pictures of Girls" and "These Days". They performed "Pictures of Girls" on The Late Late Show with James Corden on May 8, 2018. Their debut album, Nothing Happens, was released in March 2019. In 2020, they released their second EP Remote, including singles "Nobody Gets Me (Like You)" and "Virtual Aerobics".

Minnette performed with Wallows at Coachella 2022 which was headlined by Harry Styles, Billie Eilish and The Weeknd x Swedish House Mafia.

Filmography

Film

Television

Discography

Awards and nominations

References

External links
 
 

Living people
21st-century American male actors
21st-century American male singers
21st-century American singers
Actors from Evansville, Indiana
American male child actors
American male film actors
American male television actors
American male voice actors
Male actors from Indiana
Musicians from Evansville, Indiana
Singers from Indiana
Wallows members
1996 births